Coenraad Valentijn Bos (7 December 1875 - 5 August 1955) was a Dutch pianist, most notably as an accompanist to singers of lieder.  His peers such as Gerald Moore considered him the doyen of accompanists in his day.

Life 
He was born in Leiden in 1875. He studied under Julius Röntgen and at the Berlin High School for Music. He decided early to become an accompanist, a field of which he made a special study.

On 9 November 1896, in the presence of the composer, and still a month shy of his 21st birthday, he accompanied the Dutch baritone Anton Sistermans at the premiere of Brahms' Vier ernste Gesänge in Vienna.

In 1899 he founded The Dutch Trio (Das Holländische Trio) together with his Berlin-based countrymen Jacques van Lier and Joseph Maurits van Veen. The pianotrio was active for over ten years and acquired fame throughout Europe.

For many years he worked with singers such as Raimund von zur-Mühlen, Elena Gerhardt (USA tour 1920, Spanish tour 1928), Julia Culp, Frieda Hempel, Alexander Kipnis, Gervase Elwes, Ludwig Wüllner and Helen Traubel (he accompanied Traubel on a world tour in 1945–46).

He appeared with the 13-year-old Yehudi Menuhin in Berlin on 23 April 1929, and they exchanged inscribed photographs of themselves in commemoration of the event (Bos's gift to Menuhin is now in the Museum of the Royal Academy of Music).

He recorded lieder of Brahms, Reger, Schubert, Schumann and Wolf with Elena Gerhardt (1927–32). He figures prominently in the Hugo Wolf Society's Complete Edition 1931–38, accompanying Gerhardt, Herbert Janssen, Gerhard Hüsch, Alexandra Trianti and Elisabeth Rethberg.

He died in Chappaqua, New York, United States on 5 August 1955, aged 79.

Legacy
He preserved his musical memories in "The Well-tempered Accompanist" (1949; co-written with Ashley Pettis).

External links
 
Coenraad V. Bos at the New York Philharmonic

References

Dutch classical pianists
Classical accompanists
Berlin University of the Arts alumni
People from Chappaqua, New York
People from Leiden
1875 births
1955 deaths